Eleanor Ann Day (August 10, 1938 – May 7, 2016) was an American politician, educator, and psychologist who served as a member of the Arizona Senate from 1990 to 2000. Day was the younger sister of Supreme Court justice Sandra Day O'Connor.

Early life and education
Born in El Paso, Texas, Day received her bachelor's degree in education from Arizona State University and her master's degree in counseling and guidance from University of Arizona.

Career 
Day taught in the Alhambra and Tucson School Districts in Arizona. She also was a marriage and family therapist for the Pima County Conciliation Court. Day served in the Arizona Senate from 1990 to 2000 as a Republican. She then served on the Pima County, Arizona Board of Supervisors from 2000 to 2012. She also served on the Arizona Industrial Commission.

Personal life 
Day was the sister of retired United States Supreme Court justice Sandra Day O'Connor. On May 7, 2016, Day was killed in an automobile accident by a drunk driver involving three vehicles near Tucson, Arizona.

Notes

External links
 
 

1938 births
2016 deaths
Arizona State University alumni
University of Arizona alumni
Schoolteachers from Arizona
Women state legislators in Arizona
County supervisors in Arizona
Republican Party Arizona state senators
Road incident deaths in Arizona
20th-century American politicians
21st-century American politicians
Politicians from El Paso, Texas
People from Pima County, Arizona
20th-century American women politicians
21st-century American women politicians
Schoolteachers from Texas
American women educators
Sandra Day O'Connor